The Grand Pacific Drive is scenic drive in Australia.

External links

http://www.grandpacificdrive.com.au/

Tourist attractions in Wollongong